The Holiday Show is an Irish travel show that first aired on TV3 in Ireland on 4 January 2013. The show sees presenters Ciara Whelan and Jon Slattery travelling to various locations throughout Ireland exploring the depths of Ireland's hidden holiday destinations.
The last episode featuring Northern Ireland was shown on 8 February 2013.

Destinations
County Cork
County Kerry
County Mayo
County Wexford
Northern Ireland

References

External links
The Holiday Show on the TV3 Website
Official Site

2013 Irish television series debuts
Virgin Media Television (Ireland) original programming